Polemon bocourti, or Bocourt's snake-eater, is a species of venomous rear-fanged snake in the subfamily Aparallactinae of the family Atractaspididae. The species is endemic to Central Africa (from Cameroon through Equatorial Guinea to Gabon and east to the Republic and Democratic Republic of the Congo).

Etymology
The specific name, bocourti, is in honor of French herpetologist Marie Firmin Bocourt.

Geographic range
Polemon bocourti is found in Cameroon, Equatorial Guinea, Gabon, Republic of the Congo, and western and central Democratic Republic of the Congo.

Habitat

Description
Polemon bocourti is similar to P. barthii, but is distinguished from it by having two postoculars, and by having a lower number of ventrals, only 199–202.

Behavior
Polemon bocourti is terrestrial and fossorial.

Reproduction
Polemon bocourti is oviparous.

References

Further reading
Chirio L, LeBreton M (2008). Atlas des reptiles du Cameroun. Paris: Publications scientifiques du Muséum national d'histoire naturelle. 688 pp. . (Polemon bocourti, p. 642). (in French). 
Hughes B (2003). "Polemon barthii Jan 1858 and Polemon bocourti Mocquard 1897, two West African snakes which are allopatric, not sympatric". African Journal of Herpetology 52 (2): 113–117.
Pauwels OSG, Vande Weghe JP (2008). Les Reptiles du Gabon. Washington, District of Columbia: Smithsonian Institution. xxvi + 298 pp. . (in French).

External link

Atractaspididae
Reptiles of Cameroon
Reptiles of the Democratic Republic of the Congo
Reptiles of Equatorial Guinea
Reptiles of Gabon
Reptiles of the Republic of the Congo
Taxa named by François Mocquard
Reptiles described in 1897